Tetrahydrofurfuryl acetate is an organic chemical compound used for food flavouring and cosmetics. It has a fruity ethereal flavour, also described as honey, maple, or bread-like.

It is generally accepted as safe in the USA. Typical levels of use are 2 ppm in drinks, 8 ppm in icecream, and 20 ppm in baked products and confectionery.

Classified as a heterocyclic ester, it is made by reacting tetrahydrofurfuryl alcohol with acetic anhydride.

Related flavouring compounds are tetrahydrofurfuryl butyrate, tetrahydrofurfuryl cinnamate, tetrahydrofurfuryl alcohol, and tetrahydrofurfuryl propionate.

References

Food additives
Flavors
Tetrahydrofurans
Acetate esters